KCDC (102.5 FM) is a radio station licensed to Loma, Colorado, United States. The station is owned by Cochise Media Licenses LLC.

Construction permit
On May 21, 2009, the then-KDVC was granted a U.S. Federal Communications Commission construction permit to change the city of license from Dove Creek, Colorado to Loma, Colorado, move to a new transmitter site, decrease ERP to 400 watts and increase HAAT to 383 meters. The license for the new facility was issued on September 6, 2016.

References

External links
 
FCC construction permit

CDC
Radio stations established in 2008
2008 establishments in Colorado